Anetarca is a genus of sea slugs, specifically of aeolid nudibranchs.

Species
Species in this genus include:
 Anetarca armata Gosliner, 1991
 Anetarca brasiliana García & Troncoso, 2004
 Anetarca piutaensis (Ortea, Caballer & Espinosa, 2003)

References

Facelinidae